Gafuri (Ğafuri) is a rural locality (a selo) and the administrative centre of Gafuriysky Selsoviet, Buzdyaksky District, Bashkortostan, Russia. The population was 609 as of 2010. There are 11 streets.

Geography 
Gafuri is located 8 km east of Buzdyak (the district's administrative centre) by road. Syrtlanovo is the nearest rural locality.

References 

Rural localities in Buzdyaksky District